Christopher William Gray (born June 19, 1970) is a former American football guard of the National Football League (NFL). He was drafted by the Miami Dolphins in the fifth round of the 1993 NFL Draft. He played college football at Auburn.

Gray played four seasons with the Dolphins until 1996, one season for the Chicago Bears in 1997 and finally over a decade with the Seattle Seahawks. He retired from the Seahawks prior to the 2008 season because he was "at risk for paralysis because of a lower back and spine injury...."

Chris Gray holds the Seahawks franchise record for consecutive starts with 121 and is 9th for total games with 145.

Although he never made it into the Pro Bowl, he was an integral part of the offensive line that blocked for Matt Hasselbeck and Shaun Alexander during their five consecutive playoff appearances (2003–2007), including Alexander's MVP year in 2005. He was also on the 1999 AFC West Champion Seahawks. During his career with the Seahawks, he played every position on their offensive line.

In 2008, Gray was a recipient of the Ed Block Courage Award, and in 2015, he was inducted into the Alabama Sports Hall of Fame.

References

External links
 Seattle Seahawks nio
 Seattle Seahawks career profile

1970 births
Living people
American football centers
American football offensive guards
Auburn Tigers football players
Chicago Bears players
Miami Dolphins players
Seattle Seahawks players
Players of American football from Birmingham, Alabama
Ed Block Courage Award recipients